Lacydes spectabilis is a moth of the family Erebidae. It was described by August Michael Tauscher in 1806. It is found in south-eastern Ukraine, eastern European Russia, western Siberia, Kazakhstan, Central Asia, Armenia, eastern Turkey, Turkmenistan, Afghanistan, China (Xinjiang) and southern Mongolia.

The wingspan is about 32 mm.

Subspecies
Lacydes spectabilis spectabilis (south-eastern Ukraine, eastern European Russia, western Siberia, Kazakhstan, Central Asia, Turkmenistan, Afghanistan, China: Xinjiang, southern Mongolia)
Lacydes spectabilis annellata (Christoph, 1887) (Armenia, eastern Turkey, Kopet Dagh, Great Balkhan Mountains, Elburz Mountains)

References

Callimorphina
Moths of Asia
Moths of Europe
Moths of the Middle East
Insects of Central Asia
Fauna of Western Asia
Biota of Xinjiang
Moths described in 1806